Cléopâtre is an opera by Jules Massenet which premiered in 1914.

Cléopâtre may also refer to:

 "Cléopâtre" (ballet), a 1908 ballet by Mikhail Fokine
 Cléopâtre (1899 film), a French short film by Georges Méliès
 French ship Cléopâtre, three frigates

See also
 Cleopatra (disambiguation)
 Kleopatra (disambiguation)